KSS is a design group founded in 1991 that specialises in architecture, interior design, branding and graphics.

Their first major sports stadium project was the redevelopment of Stamford Bridge in 1991, commissioned by former Chelsea FC chairman Ken Bates, integrating retail, commercial, hotel and residential usages around the football stadium. Recent years have seen the completion of Falmer Stadium in Brighton, Twickenham Stadium Players’ Facilities, London 2012 Basketball Arena, Tottenham Hotspur FC’s training centre and Brighton Hove Albion FC’s training complex.

The practice has recently completed the Main Stand expansion at Anfield for Liverpool FC, Sammy Ofer Stadium in Haifa, Israel which achieved UEFA Category 4 status, and Stade Océane in La Havre, France, which is Europe’s first energy positive stadium.

KSS have recently unveiled plans for Crystal Palace FC's Selhurst Park redevelopment and new training facilities for Leicester City FC and Liverpool FC.

KSS has also acted as technical advisers for Manchester City FC’s move from Maine Road to the Etihad Stadium which hosted the 2002 Commonwealth Games and was also the external technical reviewer for post-2012 Summer Olympics transformation at the Olympic Stadium.

Notable projects

Sport

 Aberdeen Sports Village (2009)
 Falmer Stadium, Brighton (2011)
 Anfield Stadium expansion, Liverpool (2016)
 Ascot Racecourse, Berkshire (2004)
 Bath Rugby Stadium Redevelopment 
 Bolton Wanderers Training Academy, Lostock (2007)
 Brighton & Hove Albion Training Ground (2013)
 City of Manchester Stadium (2003)
 Craven Cottage Riverside Stand expansion, London (2012)
 Crystal Palace FC Selhurst Park redevelopment, London (2018)
 Elland Road Stadium, Leeds (2009)
 The Fratton End, Fratton Park, Portsmouth (1997)
 Leicester City FC New Training Facility (2018)
 Liverpool FC New Training Centre (2018)
 London 2012 Aquatic Centre
 London 2012 Basketball Arena (2011)
 London 2012 Olympic Stadium
 New Plough Lane (2019)
 No.1 Court, The Championships, Wimbledon, London (2018)
 Twickenham Stadium, London (2013)
 Wembley Stadium, One Twenty Suite, London (2017)

Education

 Barking and Dagenham College, London
 Dover Christ Church Academy, Kent
 St. Augustine Academy, Kent
 Luton Sixth Form College
 South Essex College
 Goodwin Academy, Kent
 Meopham School, Kent

International

 Bentley Pavilion, Wolfsburg, Germany
 Estadio Cidade de Coimbra, Portugal
 National Stadium, Japan
 Sammy Ofer Stadium, Haifa, Israel
 Stade Océane, Le Havre, France

Other

 Alexander House Hotel, Sussex
 Anchor House, Chelsea
 Kalido Offices, London
 Learning and Skills Council, London
 Merlin Studio, London
 Newlon Head Office, London
 SKM Offices, London

References

External links
www.kssgroup.com

Architecture firms based in London
Interior design firms
Design companies of the United Kingdom